Koriten Glacier is the 5.5 km long and 1.3 km wide glacier on Pernik Peninsula, Loubet Coast in Graham Land, Antarctica, situated northwest of Wilkinson Glacier.  It flows southwestwards from Protector Heights and enters the head of Chepra Cove.

The glacier is named after the settlement of Koriten in Northeastern Bulgaria.

Location
British mapping in 1976.

Maps
 Antarctic Digital Database (ADD). Scale 1:250000 topographic map of Antarctica. Scientific Committee on Antarctic Research (SCAR). Since 1993, regularly upgraded and updated.
British Antarctic Territory. Scale 1:200000 topographic map. DOS 610 Series, Sheet W 66 66. Directorate of Overseas Surveys, Tolworth, UK, 1976.

References
 Bulgarian Antarctic Gazetteer. Antarctic Place-names Commission. (details in Bulgarian, basic data in English)
Koriten Glacier. SCAR Composite Antarctic Gazetteer.

External links
 Koriten Glacier. Copernix satellite image

Bulgaria and the Antarctic
Glaciers of Loubet Coast